Mathurin Kameni (born 4 February 1978) is a Cameroonian former professional footballer who played as a goalkeeper.

Football career
Kameni was born in Douala. During his professional career he played for Coton Sport FC de Garoua, RC Bafoussam (January–June 2005) and Haras El Hodoud SC.

Although he did not win any caps, Kameni was part of the Cameroonian squad at the 2004 African Cup of Nations, as the side finished top of its group in the first round before losing in the quarterfinals to Nigeria.

Personal life
Kameni's younger brother, Carlos, was also a footballer, a goalkeeper and an international.

References

External links

1978 births
Living people
Footballers from Douala
Cameroonian footballers
Association football goalkeepers
Coton Sport FC de Garoua players
Haras El Hodoud SC players
2004 African Cup of Nations players
Cameroonian expatriate footballers
Expatriate footballers in Egypt
Cameroonian expatriate sportspeople in Egypt